Sanso is a small town and commune in the Cercle of Bougouni in the Sikasso Region of south-western Mali. In 2009 the commune had a population of 22,284.

The Morila Gold Mine is located 10 km from the village.

References

Communes of Sikasso Region